Alessio Taliani (born 11 October 1990) is an Italian professional racing cyclist, currently suspended from the sport. Taliani tested positive for triamcinolone acetonide at the 2016 Volta a Portugal; in October 2017, he was given a backdated four-year ban, and is unable to compete until August 2020.

Major results

2012
 9th Giro del Belvedere
2013
 1st Coppa della Pace
 4th GP Capodarco
2014
 7th Overall Sibiu Cycling Tour
2015
 5th Overall Sibiu Cycling Tour
1st Stage 3

References

External links
 

1990 births
Living people
Italian male cyclists
Sportspeople from Livorno
Cyclists from Tuscany